Jameh Mosque of Tehran is the oldest mosque in Tehran, with its oldest Shabestan, more than a thousand years old, and is also known as the Atiq Mosque.

References

Mosques in Iran
Mosque buildings with domes
National works of Iran
Tehran